Irène Marie Jacob (born 15 July 1966) is a French-Swiss actress known for her work with Polish film director Krzysztof Kieślowski. She won the 1991 Cannes Film Festival Award for Best Actress for the Kieślowski film The Double Life of Veronique, and was nominated for the BAFTA Award for Best Actress in a Leading Role for her 1994 film Three Colours: Red. Her other film appearances include The Secret Garden (1993), Beyond the Clouds (1995), U.S. Marshals (1998), and Eternity (2016).

Early life
Irène Jacob was born in Suresnes, Hauts-de-Seine, a western suburb of Paris. The youngest child with three older brothers, she was raised in a highly educated and intellectual family and environment: her father, Maurice Jacob, was a physicist; her mother, a psychologist; one brother, Francis Jacob, a musician; and her other two brothers, scientists. In 1969, at the age of three, Irène moved with her family to Geneva, Switzerland, where she became interested in the arts.

Jacob developed an interest in performing after seeing the films of Charlie Chaplin. "They took my heart", she has recalled. "They made me laugh and cry, and that was exactly what I was waiting for in a film: to awaken me to my feelings."

She made her stage debut in 1977 at the age of 11. She attended the Geneva Conservatory of Music and earned a degree in languages (she speaks fluent French, English, German, and Italian). She also studied at the Drama Studio in London, England. In 1984, she moved to Paris, where she studied acting at the prestigious Rue Blanche (the French national drama academy).

Career
In Paris, the 21-year-old drama student obtained her first film role in the Louis Malle film Au revoir les enfants (1987), playing the part of a piano teacher. She followed her film debut with several French movies—mostly minor roles—over the next four years.

Polish film director Krzysztof Kieślowski cast her in the lead role of his film The Double Life of Veronique (1991), the allegorical story of two young women, one in Poland and the other in France, both of whom are played by Jacob. For her performance, Jacob won the Best Actress award at the Cannes Film Festival.

From 1992 to 1993, despite numerous offers from Hollywood that came in the wake of her success, including the lead role in Indecent Proposal, Jacob focused on smaller French films.

Jacob gained international acclaim as the protagonist in Kieślowski's Three Colours: Red (1994), which received three Academy Award nominations for Best Director, Best Cinematography, and Best Original Screenplay. The film was also named Best Film or Best Foreign Film by the National Board of Review, New York Film Critics Circle Awards, National Society of Film Critics Awards, and Los Angeles Film Critics Association Awards. It received César Award nominations for Best Film, Best Actor (Jean-Louis Trintignant), Best Actress (Irène Jacob), Best Director (Krzysztof Kieślowski), Best Writing (Krzysztof Kieślowski and Krzysztof Piesiewicz). The New York Times included the film in its list of "The Best 1000 Movies Ever Made."

Naturally an introvert, Jacob has the remarkable ability to express the emotional turmoil of her characters with very few words. This was very evident in her performance in Three Colours: Red, the third part of Kieślowski's trilogy. Jacob described her unique experience working with the Polish film director:

Her performance in Three Colours: Red gained huge international recognition, bringing further offers from major American motion-picture studios. Jacob retreated from public attention and took nine months off, spending most of her time reading Tolstoy, Balzac, Singer, and several autobiographies.

From 1995 to 1999, Jacob made a series of American and European films that met with varying degrees of commercial and critical success. In 1995, she appeared in six films, including Victory, with Willem Dafoe and Sam Neill; Michelangelo Antonioni's Beyond the Clouds; and Oliver Parker's adaptation of William Shakespeare's Othello, in which Jacob spoke all of her lines in English for the first time on film. In the following years, she made several moderately successful American films, including Incognito (1997); U.S. Marshals (1998), starring opposite Wesley Snipes and Tommy Lee Jones; The Big Brass Ring (1999), with William Hurt; and Spy Games (1999), with Bill Pullman and Bruno Kirby.

Beginning in 2000, Jacob's film career slowed down, and after a series of independent, mostly European films, she revived her theatre career. In 2000, she played the title character in Madame Melville opposite Macaulay Culkin in London's West End. In 2016, she began appearing as a featured character in Season 3 of the Showtime series The Affair.

In August 2018, Jacob appeared at the Edinburgh Festival in a one-hour dramatization of the novella La Maladie de la mort (The Malady of Death) by Marguerite Duras. Jacob played the role of the unseen narrator.

Jacob is author of the book Big Bang published in 2019.

Filmography

Awards
 1991 Cannes Film Festival Award for Best Actress for The Double Life of Veronique
 1992 César Award for Best Actress nomination for The Double Life of Veronique
 1993 Sant Jordi Best Foreign Actress Award for The Double Life of Veronique
 1994 Nika Award Best Actress nomination for Predskazaniye
 1995 César Award for Best Actress nomination for Three Colours: Red
 1995 BAFTA Award for Best Actress in a Leading Role nomination for Three Colours: Red
 2002 Camerimage Krzysztof Kieślowski Special Award

References

External links

 
 
 
 Irène Jacob at Hollywood.com

1966 births
Living people
People from Suresnes
French stage actresses
French film actresses
French television actresses
French expatriates in Switzerland
Swiss stage actresses
Swiss film actresses
Swiss television actresses
20th-century French actresses
21st-century French actresses
Officers of the Ordre national du Mérite
Cannes Film Festival Award for Best Actress winners